Lulu Antariksa (born Lauren Marie-Elizabeth Antariksa; August 22, 1995) is an American actress and singer. She is best known for her role in The CW show Legacies as Penelope Park. She also starred in the web series T@gged on the streaming website go90 as Rowan Fricks.

Early life and education
Antariksa was born in Los Angeles County, California to an Indonesian father and a German mother. Antariksa is trained in dancing and singing and plays guitar, piano, ukulele, saxophone, and bass. She became interested in acting while attending Valencia High School in Santa Clarita, California.

Career
Antariksa's early roles from 2002 to 2008 were under the name Lauren Antariksa.

Antariksa's breakout role was as Stevie Baskara in the 2012 Nickelodeon sitcom How to Rock. The show premiered February 4, 2012, and ran for 25 episodes. It was not renewed for a second season.

Antariksa's other television acting credits include American Family, According to Jim, ER, Head Cases, Monk, Zoey 101, and Gemini Division.

Antariksa played high-schooler Rowan Fricks in the go90 web series T@gged from 2016 to 2018.

She played the lead role in the 2018 post-apocalyptic thriller film What Still Remains alongside Colin O'Donoghue. The film received mixed reviews, with the Los Angeles Times' review stating: "...though it gets more tense in its second half, the movie overall is a bit too sedate. Still, a great cast... brings Mendoza’s ideas to life," while Rob Hunter for Film School Rejects wrote "Antariksa does good work and convinces as a young woman who’s fully able to care for herself while still being someone in need of human contact". Screenanarchy.com's review stated: "the lead performances are very solid" and Decider called the film "a hidden gem".

Antariksa was next seen in the role of Penelope Park in the first season of The CW television series Legacies. She then starred in the short film The Lonely Host, where one reviewer called her performance "impeccable" and appeared in the film Witch Hunt, which premiered at the South by Southwest film festival in March 2021.

Filmography

Discography

Singles

Guest appearances

References

External links

Who plays Penelope on Legacies? Lulu Antariksa is a very private person

1995 births
21st-century American actresses
Actresses from California
American child actresses
American television actresses
American people of German descent
American people of Indonesian descent
Living people
People from Santa Clarita, California
American web series actresses